"In the Still of the Night" is a popular song written by Cole Porter for the MGM film Rosalie sung by Nelson Eddy and published in 1937.

Two popular early recordings were by Tommy Dorsey (vocal by Jack Leonard) and by Leo Reisman (vocal by Lee Sullivan). Dorsey's charted on October 16, 1937 and peaked at No. 3. Reisman's charted on December 25, 1937 and peaked at No. 9.

The song has since become a standard and has been recorded by many artists.

Notable recordings
Chanticleer - Lost in the Stars (1996)

References

External links
"In The Still of the Night" at JazzStandards.com
"In The Still of the Night" at SecondHandSongs.com

Songs written by Cole Porter
1937 songs
Frank Sinatra songs
Al Bowlly songs